New York Airport Service is a private bus company that provides transportation between New York metropolitan area airports and Manhattan. The service is meant to provide a middle ground between the cheaper, but slower forms of government-owned public transportation (MTA Regional Bus Operations, New York City Subway, or Long Island Rail Road) and the quick but expensive taxicabs (which generally reach Manhattan for a flat fee near $50).

New York Airport Service previously held a permit with the Port Authority of New York and New Jersey, the operator of the airports, allowing it to operate express motorcoaches between the airports and Manhattan. Scheduled stops were at John F. Kennedy International Airport, LaGuardia Airport, New York Penn Station, Grand Central Terminal, and the Port Authority Bus Terminal. Various Manhattan hotels were also served through reservations. NYAS was replaced by the NYC Airporter service, owned by Veolia Transportation, in 2013. NYAS continues to operate service to and from the airports through sister company GO Airlink Shuttle using vans.

References

External links
 NY Airport Service

Bus transportation in New York (state)
Surface transportation in Greater New York